Florindo Corral (Neves Paulista, 7 November 1949 – São Paulo, 4 April 2020) was a Brazilian businessman, founder of the University of Americana (FAM).

After a trip to Uruguay, he was diagnosed with COVID-19, of which he died at the age of 70 from complications on April 4, 2020, after being admitted to the private hospital in São Paulo for two weeks. He died as result of severe respiratory failure, caused by the disease.

He left his wife, two daughters, his son-in-law (businessman Gustavo Azzolini) and three granddaughters.

References 

Brazilian businesspeople
1949 births
2020 deaths
Deaths from the COVID-19 pandemic in São Paulo (state)

es:Florindo Corral
no:Florindo Corral
pt:Florindo Corral
tr:Florindo Corral
vo:Florindo Corral